Olav Thon Eiendomsselskap is a Norwegian real estate company that owns Shopping malls and
other commercial properties in Norway and Sweden. 
The company is headquartered in Oslo, Norway.

The company was listed on the Oslo Stock Exchange in 1983.

In June 2014, Olav Thon Eiendomsselskap bought their first Swedish shopping malls when they bought five malls from
Steen & Strøm Sweden.

Properties
As of January 1, 2014.

Shopping centres

Other commercial properties

References

Companies based in Oslo
Real estate companies established in 1982
Real estate companies of Norway
Companies listed on the Oslo Stock Exchange
1982 establishments in Norway